The Brisbane Lions' 1998 season was its second season in the Australian Football League (AFL).

Season summary

Premiership Season

Home and away season

Ladder

References

Brisbane Lions season, 1998
Brisbane Lions seasons